Charles or Charlie Murphy may refer to: Charlie Murphy

Politics
Charles Murphy (1880–1958), Irish politician more commonly referred to as Cathal Ó Murchadha
Charles Murphy (Australian politician) (1909–1997), member of the Victorian Legislative Assembly
Charles Murphy (Canadian politician) (1862–1935), member from Russell in the Canadian House of Commons 1908–1925 and Senator 1925–1935
Charles A. Murphy (born 1965), Massachusetts Representative from the 21st District
Charles Frederick Murphy (1875–1934), New York politician
Charles Francis Murphy (1858–1924), American political figure who was leader of Tammany Hall 1902–1924
Charles S. Murphy (1909–1983), White House Counsel during the Truman Administration 1951–1953
Terrence Murphy (Canadian politician) (Charles Terrence Murphy, 1926–2008), member from Sault Ste. Marie in the Canadian House of Commons 1968–1972

Sports
Charles Minthorn Murphy (1870–1950), American cyclist, known as "Mile-a-Minute Murphy"
Charles M. Murphy (coach) (1913–1999), American football, basketball, and baseball player and coach
Stretch Murphy (Charles C. Murphy, 1907–1992), All-American basketball player at Purdue University
Charles Murphy (baseball owner) (1868–1931), baseball executive and sportswriter
Charles Murphy (pitcher), American Negro leagues baseball player

Arts and entertainment
Charlie Murphy (actor) (1959–2017), American writer, actor, and stand-up comedian
Charlie Murphy (artist), artist based in London, UK
Charlie Murphy (singer-songwriter) (1953–2016), American singer-songwriter
Charlie Murphy (actress) (born 1988), Irish actress

Other
Charles Murphy (architect) (1890–1985), American architect
Charles M. Murphy (priest), Catholic priest, former rector of the Pontifical North American College
Charles B. G. Murphy (1906–1977), pioneer and philanthropist in psychiatry
Chuck Murphy (bishop) (1947–2018), American Anglican bishop
Charles Murphy (hedge fund manager) (1961–2017), American hedge fund manager